De Hirsh Margules (1899–1965) was a Romanian-born American "abstract realist" painter who crossed paths with many major American artistic and intellectual figures of the first half of the 20th century. Elaine de Kooning said that he was "[w]idely recognized as one of the most gifted and erudite watercolorists in the country".The New York Times critic Howard Devree stated in 1938 that "Margules uses color in a breath-taking manner. A keen observer, he eliminates scrupulously without distortion of his material." Devree later called Margules "one of our most daring experimentalists in the medium"" 

Margules was also a well-known participant in the bohemian culture of New York City's Greenwich Village, where he was widely known as the "Baron" of Greenwich Village. The New York Times described him as "one of Greenwich Village's best-known personalities" and "one of the best known and most buoyant characters about Greenwich Village."

Early life
De Hirsh Margules was born in 1899 in the Romanian city of Iași (also known as Iasse, Jassy, or Jasse). When Margules was 10 weeks old, his family immigrated to New York City.  Both of his parents were active in the Yiddish theater, His father was Yekutiel "Edward" Margules, a "renowned Jewish actor-impresario and founder of the Yiddish stage." Margules' mother, Rosa, thirty-nine years younger than his father, was an actress in the Yiddish theater and later in vaudeville.   Although Margules appeared as a child actor with the Adler Family and Bertha Kalich, his sister, Annette Margules, somewhat dubiously continued in family theater and vaudeville tradition, creating the blackface role of the lightly-clad Tondelayo (a part later played on film Hedy Lamarr) in Earl Carroll's 1924 Broadway exoticist hit, White Cargo.  (Annette herself faced stereotyping as an exotic flower: writing about her, publicist Charles Bouchert stated that "Romania produces a stormy, temperamental type of woman---a type admirably fitted to portray emotion.")  His brother Samuel became a noted magician who appeared under the name "Rami-Sami." Samuel later became a lawyer, representing magician Horace Goldin, among others. A family portrait including a young De Hirsh, a portrait of Rosa and Annette together, and individual photos of Rosa and Edward can be found on the Museum of the City of New York website.

At around age 9 or 10, Margules took art classes with the Boys Club on East Tenth Street, and his first taste of exhibition was at a student art show presented by the club. By age 11, he had won a city-wide prize (a box camera) at a children's art show presented by the department store Wanamakers.

As a young teenager, Margules was already displaying a characteristic kindness and loyalty. Upon hearing that two friends (one of them was author Alexander King), were in trouble for breaking a school microscope, the nearly broke Margules gave them five dollars to repair the microscope . Margules had to approach a wealthy man that Margules had once saved on the subway from a heart attack.  Margules didn't reveal the source of the five dollars to King until twenty-five years later.

In his late teens, Margules studied for a couple of months in Pittsburgh with Edwin Randby, a follower of Western painter Frederic Remington.  Thereafter he pursued a two-year course of studies in architecture, design and decoration at the New York Evening School of Art and Design, while working as a clerk during the day at Stern's Department Store. He was encouraged in these artistic pursuits by his neighbor, the painter Benno Greenstein (who later went by the name of Benjamin Benno).

Artistic career

In 1922, Margules began work as a police reporter for the City News Association of New York . Margules then considered himself something of an expert on art, and the painter Myron Lechay is said to have responded to some unsolicited analysis of his work with the remark "Since you seem to know so much about it, why don't you paint yourself?"  This led to study with Lechay and a flurry of painting.

Margules' first show was in 1922 at Jane Heap's Little Review Gallery. Thereafter Margules began to participate in shows with a group including Stuart Davis, Jan Matulka, Buckminster Fuller (exhibiting depictions of his "Dymaxion house") in a gallery run by art-lover and restaurateur Romany Marie on the floor above her cafe.

During the 1920s, Margules traveled outside of the country a number of times. In 1922, with the intent of reaching Bali, he took a job as a "'wiper on a tramp steamer where [he] played nursemaid to the engine."   He reached Rotterdam before he turned back. He would return to Rotterdam shortly thereafter.

In 1927, Margules took a lengthy leave of absence from his day job as a police reporter in order to travel to Paris, where he "set up a studio in Montmartre's Place du Tertre, on the top floor of an almost deserted hotel, a shabby establishment, lacking both heat and running water."  He studied at the Louvre and traveled to paint landscapes in provincial France and North Africa.

Margules also joined the "Noctambulist"  movement and experimented with painting and showing his artwork in low light.  Jonathan Cott wrote that:

the painter De Hirsch Margulies sat on the quays of the Seine and painted pictures in the dark. In fact, the first exhibition of these paintings, which could be seen only in a darkened room, took place in [ Walter Lowenfels'] Paris apartment.

Elaine de Kooning remarked that studying the works of the Noctambulists confirmed Margules' "direction toward the use of primary colors for perverse effects of heavy shadow."

It was also in Paris that Margules initially conceived his idea of "Time Painting", where a painting is divided into sectors, each representing a different time of day, with color choices meant to evoke that time of day.

In Paris, his social circle included Lowenfels, photographer Berenice Abbott, publisher Jane Heap, composer George Anthiel, sculptor Thelma Wood, painter André Favory, writer Norman Douglas, writer and editor George Davis, composer and writer Max Ewing, and writer Michael Fraenkel.

Upon his return to New York in 1929, Margules attended an exhibition of John Marin's paintings.

While at the exhibition, he "launched into an eloquent explanation of Marin to two nearby women", and was overheard by an impressed Alfred Stieglitz. The photographer and art promoter invited Margules to dine with his wife, the artist Georgia O'Keeffe, and his assistant, painter Emil Zoler. Stieglitz thereafter became a friend and mentor to Margules, becoming for him "what Socrates was to his friends."

Stieglitz introduced Margules to John Marin, who quickly became the most important painterly influence upon Margules. Elaine de Kooning later noted that Margules was "[i]ndebted to Marin and through Marin to Cézanne for his initial conceptual approach - for his constructions of scenes with no negative elements, for skies that loom with the impact of mountains." Margules himself said that Marin was his "father and ... academy." The admiration was by no means unreciprocated: Marin said that Margules was "an art lover with abounding faith and sincerity, with much intelligence and quick seeing."  Stieglitz also introduced Margules to many other artistic and intellectual figures in New York.

With the encouragement of Alfred Stieglitz, Margules in 1936 opened a two-room gallery at 43 West 8th Street called "Another Place." Over the following two years there were fourteen solo exhibitions by Margules and others, and the gallery was well-respected by the press. It was in this gallery that the painter James Lechay, Myron's brother, exhibited his first painting.

In 1936,  Margules first saw recognition by major art museums when both the Museum of Modern Art and the Museum of Fine Arts, Boston purchased his works.

In 1942, Margules gave up working as a police reporter, and apparently dedicated himself thereafter solely to an artistic vocation.

"The Baron of Greenwich Village"
Margules made his mark not only as an artist, but also as an outsized personality known throughout Greenwich Village and beyond.

To local residents, Margules was known as the "Baron", after Baron Maurice de Hirsch, a prominent German Jewish philanthropist. Margules was easily recognizable by the beret he routinely wore over his long hair.  Writer Charles Norman said that he "dressed with a flair for sloppiness."

He was said to "know everybody" in Greenwich Village, to the extent that when the novelist and poet Maxwell Bodenheim was murdered, Margules was the first one the police sought to identify the body.  Margules' letters show him interacting with art world figures such as Sacha Kolin, John Marin and Alfred Stieglitz, as well as with prominent figures outside the art world such as polymath Buckminster Fuller and writer Henry Miller.

Most of his friends and acquaintances found Margules a generous and voluble man, given to broadly emotionally expressive gestures and acts of kindness and loyalty. In 1929, he exhibited an example of this loyalty and fellow-feeling when he appeared in court to fight what  the wrongful commitment of his friend, writer and sculptor Alfred Dreyfuss, who appeared to have been a victim of an illicit attempt to block an inheritance.

The Greenwich Village chronicler Charles Norman described the bone-crushing hugs that Margules would routinely bestow on his friends and acquaintances, and speaks of the "persuasive theatricality" that Margules seemed to have inherited from his actor parents. Norman also wrote about Margules' routine acts of kindness, taking in homeless artists, constantly feeding his friends and providing the salvatory loan where needed.  
Norman also notes that Margules was blessed with a loud and good voice, and was apt to sing an operatic air without provocation.

The writer and television personality Alexander King said

I think the outstanding characteristics of my friend's personality are affirmation, emphasis, and overemphasis. He chooses to express himself predominantly in superlatives and the gestures which accompany his utterances are sometimes dangerous to life and limb. Of the bystanders, I mean.

King also spoke with affectionate amusement about Margules' pride in his cooking, speaking of how "if he should ever invite you to dinner, he may serve you a hamburger with onions, in his kitchen-living room, with such an air of gastronomic protocol, such mysterious hints and ogliing innuendoes, as if César Ritz and Brillat-Savarin had sneaked out, only a moment before, with his secret recipe in their pockets."

Margules was such a memorable New York personality that comic book writer Alvin Schwartz imagined him at the Sixth Avenue Cafeteria in a risible yet poignant debate with Clark Kent about whether Superman had the ability to stop Hitler.

Margules' entrenchment in the Greenwich Village milieu can be seen in a photograph from Fred McDarrah's "Beat Generation Album" of a January 13, 1961 writers' and poets' meeting to discuss "The Funeral of the Beat Generation", in 's railroad flat at 85 Christopher Street. Among the people in the same photograph are Shel Silverstein, Lester Blackiston, James Baldwin, Norman Mailer, beat poet Howard Hart, and Ted Joans.  Incidentally, Hart mentioned Margules in his poem "Thelonious Monk," referring to the "thin wood rocking chair De Hirsch Margules's weight / Had busted Bless him now and forever."

More photos of Margules can be seen on the Smithsonian's "Archives of American Art" website, which has three photos which capture Margules' innate theatricality. One of them shows Margules (wearing his customary beret) jumping with childlike glee in a New York City Park, surrounded by a flurry of pigeons. Another shows Margules in his studio, brush in hand, posing in front of one of his paintings. A third. also taken in a New York City park, shows Margules in a display of mock-pomp, his hand inside his shirt a la Napoleon Bonaparte.

Death

Among the three articles The New York Times dedicated to Margules' death was a mournful paean to lost Greenwich Village life written by Bernard Weinraub: "The Baron was De Hirsh Margules, painter, poet and newspaper reporter. He was remembered yesterday, on his burial, with the same gusto that marked his life in the Village."

Maurice, the self-styled "Prince of Bohemia" of Greenwich Village, remarked that

Once there were so many genuine Bohemians in the Village. But now, so few oldtimers are left. Jake Spencer and Earl Kirkham and Harrison Doud are gone--all gone. And now the Baron.

Artist Leslie Jencel was quoted as saying

I'm wearing my black leather cape today because De Hirsh would have wanted me to.  He had such a sense of drama, of color. He had such a spirit of youth and creativity-a rare and wise and unusual man.

Another artist, Aristodimos Kaldis, said

He was one of the last of the true Villagers. We used to go to the old Waldorf Cafeteria on Sixth Avenue and debate esthetics-whether Rembrandt was the master of light, or El Greco or Tintoretto. We used to debate all night. Now of course, those days are gone.

Margules' sister, actress Annette Margules, remembered him as

charitable and generous to all who needed help. He took care of people, he even fed people. Why, last night, people came up to me and said, 'How am I going to eat now that De Hirsh is gone?

The supposedly penniless Margules left an estate of more than $100,000, the amount and circumstances of which were enough to merit a New York Times article and a mention by nationally syndicated celebrity columnist Leonard Lyons, who remarked

the big shock to Greenwich Village's Bohemian colony last week was in learning that the Bohemian painter, de Hirsch Margolis [sic], left a huge estate. He was a stock market wizard.

(This is a conclusion that has been disputed with by Charles Norman, who stated that collector Harrison D. Horblit purchased all remaining Margules paintings "in order to swell the estate.")

Among the forty-five people sharing in his estate were "beneficiaries living in such diverse areas as Greenwich Village, Paris, Niagara Falls, Oyster Bay, and the Lower East Side of Manhattan."

Exhibitions and Critical Reception

Museum holdings

Other Links To The Artwork of De Hirsh Margules

Other examples of Margules' work can be found elsewhere online.  Since some of these links are from galleries, these may become unusable after the items are sold.

The site americanjewishart.com displays an undated watercolor entitled "East Gloucester"

Artdaily.org shows a 1939 collaboration among Arshile Gorky, Margules and Isamu Noguchi entitled "Hitler invades Poland" According to Noguchi, the trio "made several paintings together at that time."

A large cache of Margules works was sold in 2007 by CRN Auctions. Thumbnails of these works can be seen ib crnauctions.com  Characterful portraits of the artists Milton Avery and Abraham Walkowitz and a self-portrait of Margules (which was not for sale) are visible here. Various "Time Paintings" are also on display, but many of these and other complicated works are hard to appreciate fully due to the low resolution and small image size. (There is a link to enlarge the images, but it does not work.) Of additional interest here is a portrait by James Lechay of Margules.

The gallery Levis Fine Art has an online collection of intensely colored Margules paintings  made up of the 1938 mixed media painting  "The Boatyard", a 1939 gouache of a waterfront scene entitled "Diagonals in Purple and Red", a 1939 waterfront and airfield scene called "Diagonals with Airforms and Hedges", and a couple of 1943 paintings of airplanes in flight, one untitled and the other one named "Convergence."

The Birnham Wood Gallery also has quite a few Margules works on display. Among the best here are a watercolor from 1941, entitled "Figures and Flowers at Rest", a 1951 watercolor and gouache of a ship battling a stormy sea called "The Flying Dutchman", a serene watercolor view of the High Bridge over New York City's Harlem river named "High Bridge on the Hudson", an angular and deeply colored 1937 piece called "Red Spector among the Sail Lofts", and a jaunty undated waterfront view entitled "Safe Harbor."

References

1899 births
1965 deaths
Artists from Iași
Romanian emigrants to the United States
American watercolorists
People from Greenwich Village
Romanian Jews
Jewish American artists
20th-century American painters
American male painters
20th-century American Jews
20th-century American male artists